The WNBA is the Women's National Basketball Association in North America.

WNBA may also refer to:

 World Ninepin Bowling Association
 Women's National Book Association
 Woman's National Bowling Association, now Women's International Bowling Congress